Uzma Kardar (born 8 April 1956) is a Lahore based Pakistani Politician & Educationalist.

Early life and education
She was born on 8 April 1956 in Lahore, Pakistan, in an Arain Family. She has a degree of Bachelor of Arts. from Kinnaird College Lahore.

Political career

She was elected to the Provincial Assembly of the Punjab as a candidate of Pakistan Tehreek-e-Insaf (PTI) on a reserved seat for women in 2018 Pakistani general election. She is held defunct by Election Commission of Pakistan on May 20, 2022. She was expelled from PTI for violation of party discipline https://www.thenews.com.pk/amp/682473-pti-expels-mpa-uzma-kardar-from-party</ref> She has been ordered to resign from the provincial assembly after it was proven that is she is going to vote against party policy. She got de-seated due to vote against party policy for Chief Minister of Punjab election  on 16 April 2022.Uzma made an appeal with SC of Pakistan against her disqualification.

References

Living people
Punjabi people
Punjab MPAs 2018–2023
Pakistan Tehreek-e-Insaf MPAs (Punjab)
1956 births
Women members of the Provincial Assembly of the Punjab
21st-century Pakistani women politicians